Garden is an unincorporated community in Athens County, in the U.S. state of Ohio.

History
A post office called Garden was established 1852, and remained in operation until 1904. Besides the post office, Garden had several shops, a country store, and a church.

References

Unincorporated communities in Athens County, Ohio
1852 establishments in Ohio
Populated places established in 1852
Unincorporated communities in Ohio